An airside pass is a type of secure keycard issued by the authorities of a specific airport to their employees, and serves as a means for the employee to pass through security situated between the airside and landside sections of the facility. Employees requiring an airside pass are subject to numerous security checks, including a criminal records check and proof of identity.

References

Public transport